British American Investment (BAIC)  was an investment conglomerate based in Mauritius. Seized by the Government of Mauritius in 2015 for operating an alleged ponzi scheme that has never been prosecuted or proven in any court of law. However BAIC could not provide sufficient information and details about its irregularities in its operations.

Overview
British American Investment Company (Mauritius) Limited's investments range from financial services, trade and commerce, transport, real estate, leisure and hospitality and health care. The group has over 50 companies under these divisions with presence in Mauritius, South Africa, Madagascar, Kenya, Dubai, France and Malta.

The group was ranked the second largest group in Mauritius in 2010.

April 2015, British American Group of companies was seized by the Government of Mauritius, under the claim of an alleged massive ponzi perpetuated by the principal shareholder. After four years, the Government has not provided a single piece of evidence to support the accusation. However evidence has been found supporting the claim of the principal shareholder, and many clients that the actions of the government of the Republic of Mauritis was illegal.

Seizure by Republic of Mauritius 
On April 3, 2015, BAIC's banking subsidiary, Bramer Banking Corporation, banking license was revoked by the Bank of Mauritius following an alleged US$693 million Ponzi scheme being run at the bank.

This alleged ponzi scandal also affected BAIC's insurance subsidiary, BAI Co. The firm's stock were suspended from trading on the same day and PricewaterhouseCoopers was appointed as the receiver manager then the law was changed and back dated to legalize the appointment of PWC. There has been evidence of Ponzi scheme  and opinions in the country remain severely divided on whether the company was the victim of a political conspiracy or if the scandal was in fact a genuine Ponzi scheme. The question is that if Dawood Rawat is a role model or a master of swindling? 
 
On April 21, 2014 an international arrest warrant was issued for some of the BAIC directors wanted for fraud, money-laundering and embezzlement. The Mauritian Cabinet has since been drawing up plans to seize BAIC's assets and investments.

Ownership 
BAIC is a wholly owned subsidiary of Bahamas Based Seaton Investment which is in turn 85.8% owned by Klad Investment Corporation, the Rawat family investment vehicle.

See also 
 Bramer Banking Corporation
 British-American Investments Company
 CL Financial

References

External links 
 Bramer Corporation Limited
 British American Investment Co. (Mtius) Ltd
 Website of Bank of Mauritius

Conglomerate companies of Mauritius
Companies based in Port Louis
Holding companies with year of establishment missing